Boguty-Pianki  is a village in Ostrów Mazowiecka County, Masovian Voivodeship, in east-central Poland. It is the seat of the gmina (administrative district) called Gmina Boguty-Pianki.

References

Boguty-Pianki
Łomża Governorate
Białystok Voivodeship (1919–1939)
Warsaw Voivodeship (1919–1939)
Belastok Region